Woorree is an eastern suburb of Geraldton, Western Australia. Its local government area is the City of Greater Geraldton.

The suburb was gazetted in 1981.

Geography
It is bounded by Place Road to the north, Polo Road to the east and Geraldton-Mount Magnet Road to the south.

Demographics

References

Suburbs of Geraldton